Englewood Schools is a school district located in Englewood, Colorado, United States, in the Greater Denver area.

The district includes the majority of Englewood and sections of Cherry Hills Village and Littleton.

History

In 1991 Roscoe Davidson, the superintendent, won "Colorado Superintendent of the Year" in 1991. He retired in 1999. Ginny McKibben of the Denver Post said that Davidson "has represented the best for many Colorado educators: scholarly, impeccably dressed and imbued with the voice of reason."

In 2000 the district enrollment decreased by 188 students, above the predicted loss of 100 students. As a result, the school district lost $1 million in funding for the 1999–2000 school year. Steven White, the superintendent, said that he would attempt to find methods to attract more students, and that the decline would result in budget cuts. Ginny McKibben of the Denver Post said that in general outlying school districts in Greater Denver were "flourishing" but that Englewood Schools had a different scenario.

Schools
High schools
 Englewood High School
 Colorado's Finest Alternative High School (CFAHS) - The school received its current name after a group of students asked that the school receive that name. On December 9, 1991 the school was named a Colorado School of Excellence.
Middle schools
 Englewood Middle School
 Englewood Leadership Academy (ELA) - Alternate school for accelerated learning
Elementary schools
 Bishop Elementary School
 Cherrelyn Elementary School
 Clayton Elementary School
 Charles Hay World Elementary School
Pre-K
 Englewood Schools Early Childhood Education (ECE) Program at Maddox

References

External links

 Englewood Schools

School districts in Colorado
Englewood, Colorado
Littleton, Colorado